A Visit from the Goon Squad is a 2011 Pulitzer Prize-winning work of fiction by American author Jennifer Egan. The book is a set of thirteen interrelated stories with a large set of characters all connected to Bennie Salazar, a record company executive, and his assistant, Sasha. The book centers on the mostly self-destructive characters of different ages who, as they grow older, are sent in unforeseen, and sometimes unusual, directions by life. The stories shift back and forth in time from the 1970s to the present and into the near future. Many of the stories take place in and around New York City, although other settings include San Francisco, Italy, and Kenya.

In addition to winning the Pulitzer Prize, the book also won the National Book Critics Circle Award for fiction in 2010. The novel received mostly positive reviews from critics and later appeared in many lists of the best fiction works of the 2010s.

Collection or novel

Because of its unusual narrative structure, some critics have characterized the book as a novel and others as a collection of linked short stories. A Visit from the Goon Squad has 13 chapters, which can be read as individual stories and which do not focus on any single central character or narrative arc. Many were originally published as short stories in magazines such as the New Yorker and Harper's Magazine. In an interview with Salon.com's Laura Miller, Egan said she leaned toward calling the book a novel rather than a short story collection. She has also said that she considers the book to be neither a story collection nor a novel.

Stories

 "Found Objects" – Sasha, a kleptomaniac, steals a woman's wallet while on a date with Alex. She returns the wallet to its owner, who does not turn Sasha in. She later steals a note from Alex's wallet. Set in the present day, told in the third person from Sasha's perspective.
 "The Gold Cure" – Bennie, Sasha, and Bennie's son Christopher attend a performance of one of bands Bennie works with, Stop/Go, who now have 4 members instead of 3. Set in the recent past, told in the third person from Bennie's perspective.
 "Ask Me If I Care" – In Bennie and Scotty's teenage years, their band, The Flaming Dildos, scores a show at a punk club, thanks to a music producer named Lou, who is dating their friend Jocelyn. Set in the early 1980s in San Francisco, told by Rhea – a friend of the band. 
 "Safari" – Lou takes his children, Rolph and Charlene, and his new girlfriend Mindy, on a hunting safari in Kenya. Set in 1973, the story is told in the third person, mostly from Mindy's perspective and details a lion attack that happens on the safari. 
 "You (Plural)" – Jocelyn and Rhea visit Lou on his death bed. Set about a decade in the past, told by Jocelyn.
 "X's and O's" – Scotty delivers a fish to Bennie at his Sow's Ear Records office, where they have a tense conversation. Set a few years in the past, told by Scotty.
 "A to B" – Stephanie, Bennie's wife and a publicist, and her brother Jules, visit Bosco, an aging rockstar who wants to go on a comeback tour. Set a few years in the past, told in the third person from Stephanie's perspective.
 "Selling the General" – Dolly, a washed-up publicist, enlists formerly famous starlet Kitty Jackson to help soften the image of a murderous dictator who has hired Dolly. Set in the present, told by Dolly.
 "Forty Minute Lunch: Kitty Jackson Opens Up About Love, Fame and Nixon! Jules Jones Reports" – Jules interviews Kitty Jackson, as he has been hired to write a magazine article about her. However, as their lunch is drawing to a close, Jules convinces Kitty to go for a walk with him in Central Park, where he assaults her. Set a few years in the past, presented as a magazine article that Jules writes while in prison.
 "Out of Body" – Rob and Drew, Sasha's boyfriend, spend a night partying, before they go for a swim in the East River, where Rob drowns. Set a decade or so in the past, told in the second person from Rob's perspective.
 "Goodbye, My Love" – Ted Hollander is in Naples, ostensibly looking for his niece Sasha, who disappeared two years before. However, Ted is using the all-expenses-paid trip as an excuse to visit museums and see art. Set about a decade and a half in the past, told in the third person from Ted's point of view.
"Great Rock and Roll Pauses by Alison Blake" – Set about 15 years in the future, presented as a PowerPoint presentation made by Alison, Sasha and Drew's daughter.
"Pure Language" – Alex, an audio technician, is hired by Bennie to find 50 'parrots' – essentially people paid to feign fandom – for Scotty's debut show. Set about 15 years in the future, told from Alex's point of view in the third person.

Characters

  Sasha: Runs away to Asia and then Naples as a teenager, then studies at NYU and later becomes Bennie's assistant (for 12 years). Is a kleptomaniac. Marries late and moves to the desert to raise her two kids.
  Bennie: Interested in the music business. Once a member of the "Flaming Dildos" band, with Scotty, Alice, Rhea, and Jocelyn. Later creates his own record label.
  Lou: A music producer, and Bennie's mentor. Has many different affairs, marriages and children.
  Scotty: Member of the Flaming Dildos as a teenager, continues on the margins of society in later life. Achieves a level of musical success as an older man.
  Stephanie: Bennie's first wife. A member of a country club she resents, but where she enjoys playing tennis.
  Dolly: Publicist in pursuit of fame who loses her business in disgrace. Eventually opens a cheese shop upstate.
  Lulu: Dolly's daughter; unsure of father. Replaces Sasha as Bennie's assistant in the final story, set in the near-future.
  Kitty: A hugely successful teen star who becomes jaded and harsh after Jules assaults her. Later does a publicity job for Dolly.
  Jules: Stephanie's older brother. A bi-polar celebrity journalist who goes to prison after assaulting Kitty.
  Rob: Sasha's bisexual best friend in college. Survives a suicide attempt but drowns while swimming with Sasha's boyfriend months later.
  Bosco: Guitarist. Once a rockstar in The Conduits, later an overweight cancer survivor with health problems.
  Alex: Went on a date and slept with Sasha in his twenties, later marries Rebecca and has a daughter Cara-Ann. Does a job for Bennie, secretly advertising Scotty's show.
 Rhea: Friend of Jocelyn, Scotty, and Bennie in her youth, harrowingly insecure and a member of the punk scene in San Francisco. 
  Jocelyn: Dated (middle-aged) Lou when she was teenager. Later visits Lou as he is dying.
 Drew: Sasha's boyfriend in college. Present when Rob drowns. He and Sasha re-connect years later, get married and have two children, and move to the desert. He is a doctor.
 Ted: Sasha's uncle, an art history professor, who goes looking for her while she is in Naples.
 Alison: Drew and Sasha's daughter.
 Linc: Drew and Sasha's son who has autism.
 Alice: one of Bennie’s high school friends whom both he and Scotty had a crush on; married and divorced Scotty

Themes
"Goon squads" were originally groups of violent thugs sent to assault workers who tried to form labor unions. Later the term "goon" came to refer more generally to any violent thug, and this is where the book draws its central metaphor. In one story, a character named Bosco declares: "Time's a goon, right?", referring to the way that time and fate cruelly rob most of the book's characters of their youth, innocence and success. As Bosco complains: "How did I go from being a rock star to being a fat fuck no one cares about?" Some of the book's characters do end up finding happiness, but it is always a limited happiness, and it is rarely in the form they sought. In an interview, Egan explained that "time is the stealth goon, the one you ignore because you are so busy worrying about the goons right in front of you."

Many of the book's characters work in the rock music business. Rock and roll, with its emphasis on youth culture, plays into the book's themes of aging and the loss of innocence. As Egan says, "my 9-year-old loves Lady Gaga and refers to Madonna as ‘old school’. There's no way to avoid becoming part of the past." Rock music was also central to the marketing push behind the book, although the actual text does not focus directly on musicians or music making. Egan said she knew rock and roll only as a consumer at the time she began writing the book and had to do a lot of research on the subject.

Egan said the story was inspired by two sources: Proust's In Search of Lost Time, and HBO's The Sopranos. It is a novel of memory and kinship, continuity, and disconnection.

Reception

Honors
The novel won both the Pulitzer Prize for Fiction and the National Book Critics Circle Award for Fiction. The Pulitzer Prize Board noted that the novel was an "inventive investigation of growing up and growing old in the digital age, displaying a big-hearted curiosity about cultural change at warp speed".

Critical reception
In commenting on her Pulitzer, NPR critic Jonathan Bastian noted that "Egan is one of the most recent and successful examples of a trend that has been steadily seeping into the world of contemporary literature." The unusual format of the novel, taking place across multiple platforms, has led some critics to label the novel "post-postmodern". Many critics were impressed by Egan's experiments with structure, such as a section formatted like a PowerPoint printout.

In 2019, The Guardian ranked A Visit from the Goon Squad as the 24th best book since 2000. It was third place (along with Colson Whitehead’s The Underground Railroad) in a Literary Hub list of the best books of the 2010s, one of the 10 books in Time’s list of the best fiction works of the 2010s, and first place in Entertainment Weekly's list concerning the same period, with Leah Greenblatt calling it "a book as rich and resonant as any linear classic in the canon."

Adaptation
Two days after the Pulitzer Prize announcement, it was announced that a deal with HBO for a television series adaptation had been signed. However, after two years the proposal had been dropped.

References

External links
Review by Ron Charles, The Washington Post, June 16, 2010
Review by Janet Maslin, ''The New York Times Book Review, June 20, 2010

2010 American novels
Pulitzer Prize for Fiction-winning works
Novels set in New York City
Novels set in California
Novels set in Italy
Novels set in Africa
2010 short story collections
Novels about music
Alfred A. Knopf books
Postmodern novels
PEN/Faulkner Award for Fiction-winning works
Nonlinear narrative novels
National Book Critics Circle Award-winning works